Harriel "Hal" G. Geiger (ca. 1840 - 1886) was a legislator in Texas. He was elected as a Greenback Party candidate. He served from January 1879 to January 1881. He lost his re-election campaign to E. C. Mobley but won the seat in a special election, after Geiger moved out of the district, and served from April 1882 until January 1883. He lost re-election in 1882 and was convicted of bribery. He was murdered by a judge for being insolent.

Geiger was also a candidate for sheriff of Robertson County, Texas in 1884. He may have become a lawyer and was murdered, shot 5 times at point blank range, by White judge O. D. Cannon for making "insolent" remarks and not showing enough deference to his honor. Geiger survived for a while before eventually succumbing to his wounds. A trial was held and the jury cleared Cannon after a brief deliberation. Judge Cannon was convicted of murdering another unarmed lawyer, one of his neighbors, in 1899.

Geiger is described as having had one eye.

See also
African-American officeholders during and following the Reconstruction era

References

1840s births
1886 deaths
Members of the Texas House of Representatives
Texas Greenbacks
People from Robertson County, Texas
Politicians convicted of bribery under 18 U.S.C. § 201
Texas politicians convicted of crimes